Que Ganas de Volver (Eng.: I Want to Return) is the title of a studio album by Mexican Norteño-Sax band Conjunto Primavera. It was released on February 5, 2008. This album became their fifth number-one set on the Billboard Top Latin Albums.

Track listing
The information from Billboard.

Personnel
This information from Allmusic.
Jesús Guillén — Producer
Tony Gonzáles — Engineer, mastering, mixing
Conjunto Primavera — Art direction
Félix Contreras — Art direction
Adriana Rebold— Graphic design, art direction
Kike San Martin — Photography

Charts

Weekly charts

Year-end charts

References

2008 albums
Conjunto Primavera albums
Spanish-language albums
Fonovisa Records albums